"Smiling Bill McCall" is a song written and originally recorded by Johnny Cash.

The song was released as a single by Columbia Records (Columbia 4-41618, with "Seasons of My Heart" on the opposite side) in March or April 1960.

Composition 
It is a story song.

Charts

References 

Johnny Cash songs
1960 singles
Songs written by Johnny Cash
Columbia Records singles
1960 songs